Latcham is a surname. Notable people with the surname include:

Les Latcham (born 1942), English footballer
Ricardo E. Latcham (1869–1943), English-born Chilean archaeologist and ethnologist